Ian Allan may refer to:

Ian Allan (politician) (1916–2000), Australian politician
Ian Allan (publisher) (1922–2015), publisher who specialised in transport titles
His company, Ian Allan Publishing
Ian Allan (RAF officer) (1918–1988), British RAF officer

See also
Ian Allen (disambiguation)

Allan, Ian